The 2017–18 Blackwater Elite season was the fourth season of the franchise in the Philippine Basketball Association (PBA).

Key dates

2017
October 29: The 2017 PBA draft took place in Midtown Atrium, Robinson Place Manila.

Draft picks

Roster

Philippine Cup

Eliminations

Standings

Game log

|-bgcolor=ffcccc
| 1
| December 22
| Meralco
| L 98–103
| Jose, Maliksi (16)
| John Paul Erram (10)
| Roi Sumang (3)
| Cuneta Astrodome
| 0–1
|-bgcolor=ccffcc
| 2
| December 29
| Rain or Shine
| W 92–87
| Mac Belo (25)
| John Paul Erram (14)
| John Pinto (7)
| Cuneta Astrodome
| 1–1

|-bgcolor=ccffcc
| 3
| January 12
| Barangay Ginebra
| W 94–77
| Belo, Erram (22)
| John Paul Erram (11)
| Mike Cortez (4)
| Mall of Asia Arena
| 2–1
|-bgcolor=ffcccc
| 4
| January 17
| TNT
| L 83–92
| John Paul Erram (20)
| Mac Belo (13)
| Belo, Cortez, DiGregorio (3)
| Smart Araneta Coliseum
| 2–2
|-bgcolor=ffcccc
| 5
| January 19
| GlobalPort
| L 76–101
| Mac Belo (17)
| Raymar Jose (12)
| Raymar Jose (5)
| Cuneta Astrodome
| 2–3
|-bgcolor=ffcccc
| 6
| January 27
| Alaska
| L 84–88
| Belo, DiGregorio (15)
| John Paul Erram (21)
| Roi Sumang (5)
| Smart Araneta Coliseum
| 2–4

|-bgcolor=ffcccc
| 7
| February 2
| Magnolia
| L 72–78
| Mac Belo (25)
| John Paul Erram (13)
| John Paul Erram (3)
| Mall of Asia Arena
| 2–5
|-bgcolor=ccffcc
| 8
| February 9
| San Miguel
| W 106–96
| Michael DiGregorio (26)
| John Paul Erram (18)
| Allein Maliksi (8)
| Cuneta Astrodome
| 3–5
|-bgcolor=ccffcc
| 9
| February 16
| Kia
| W 95–76
| Michael DiGregorio (21)
| John Paul Erram (14)
| John Pinto (8)
| Smart Araneta Coliseum
| 4–5
|-bgcolor=ffcccc
| 10
| February 18
| NLEX
| L 90–93
| Michael DiGregorio (16)
| John Paul Erram (17)
| Belo, Cruz, Erram, Pinto (3)
| Philippine Arena
| 4–6
|-bgcolor=ccffcc
| 11
| February 21
| Phoenix
| W 83–78
| Belo, DiGregorio, Jose (14)
| John Paul Erram (19)
| DiGregorio, Erram, Pinto (4)
| Smart Araneta Coliseum
| 5–6

Commissioner's Cup

Eliminations

Standings

Game log

|-bgcolor=ffcccc
| 1
| April 22
| Columbian
| L 98–126
| Jarrid Famous (35)
| Jarrid Famous (22)
| Roi Sumang (5)
| Smart Araneta Coliseum
| 0–1
|-bgcolor=ffcccc
| 2
| April 25
| Phoenix
| L 102–107
| Roi Sumang (20)
| Jarrid Famous (16)
| Roi Sumang (5)
| Smart Araneta Coliseum
| 0–2
|-bgcolor=ffcccc
| 3
| April 29
| Alaska
| L 74–93
| Jarrid Famous (27)
| Jarrid Famous (21)
| Erram, Pinto, Sumang (4)
| Smart Araneta Coliseum
| 0–3

|-bgcolor=ffcccc
| 4
| May 2
| GlobalPort
| L 106–117
| Jarrid Famous (41)
| Jarrid Famous (22)
| Mac Belo (7)
| Ynares Center
| 0–4
|-bgcolor=ffcccc
| 5
| May 11
| Barangay Ginebra
| L 91–105
| Jarrid Famous (25)
| Jarrid Famous (17)
| Roi Sumang (7)
| Alonte Sports Arena
| 0–5
|-bgcolor=ffcccc
| 6
| May 18
| TNT
| L 101–120
| John Paul Erram (16)
| Jarrid Famous (12)
| Mike Cortez (7)
| Smart Araneta Coliseum
| 0–6
|- align="center"
|colspan="9" bgcolor="#bbcaff"|All-Star Break
|-bgcolor=ffcccc
| 7
| May 30
| NLEX
| L 89–93
| Michael DiGregorio (25)
| Henry Walker (15)
| Allein Maliksi (4)
| Smart Araneta Coliseum
| 0–7

|-bgcolor=ccffcc
| 8
| June 6
| Magnolia
| W 86–84
| John Paul Erram (19)
| John Paul Erram (15)
| John Pinto (5)
| Smart Araneta Coliseum
| 1–7
|-bgcolor=ffcccc
| 9
| June 8
| Rain or Shine
| L 94–104
| Allein Maliksi (23)
| Maliksi, Sena (7)
| Pinto, Zamar (4)
| Smart Araneta Coliseum
| 1–8
|-bgcolor=ffcccc
| 10
| June 15
| Meralco
| L 75–102
| Henry Walker (14)
| Henry Walker (13)
| Henry Walker (6)
| Mall of Asia Arena
| 1–9

|-bgcolor=ffcccc
| 11
| July 4
| San Miguel
| L 106–115
| Henry Walker (26)
| Henry Walker (12)
| John Pinto (8)
| Mall of Asia Arena
| 1–10

Governors' Cup

Eliminations

Standings

Game log

|-bgcolor=ccffcc
| 1
| August 24
| TNT
| W 104–98 (OT)
| Allein Maliksi (28)
| Henry Walker (14)
| John Pinto (4)
| Mall of Asia Arena
| 1–0

|-bgcolor=ccffcc
| 2
| September 5
| San Miguel
| W 103–100
| Henry Walker (35)
| Henry Walker (17)
| John Pinto (7)
| Smart Araneta Coliseum
| 2–0
|-bgcolor=ccffcc
| 3
| September 19
| NorthPort
| W 113–111
| Henry Walker (24)
| Henry Walker (15)
| John Pinto (13)
| Smart Araneta Coliseum
| 3–0
|-bgcolor=ccffcc
| 4
| September 21
| Barangay Ginebra
| W 124–118 (OT)
| Henry Walker (39)
| John Paul Erram (11)
| Henry Walker (9)
| Smart Araneta Coliseum
| 4–0
|-bgcolor=ffcccc
| 5
| September 26
| NLEX
| L 106–124
| Roi Sumang (24)
| Henry Walker (13)
| Henry Walker (7)
| Smart Araneta Coliseum
| 4–1

|-bgcolor=ccffcc
| 6
| October 5
| Meralco
| W 94–91
| Henry Walker (24)
| Henry Walker (14)
| Pinto, Sumang, Walker (3)
| Smart Araneta Coliseum
| 5–1
|-bgcolor=ccffcc
| 7
| October 7
| Rain or Shine
| W 99–93
| Michael DiGregorio (17)
| Henry Walker (14)
| Henry Walker (12)
| Sta. Rosa Multi-Purpose Complex
| 6–1
|-bgcolor=ffcccc
| 8
| October 10
| Magnolia
| L 99–133
| Henry Walker (27)
| Henry Walker (18)
| John Pinto (7)
| Cuneta Astrodome
| 6–2
|-bgcolor=ffcccc
| 9
| October 21
| Alaska
| L 109–116
| Henry Walker (29)
| Henry Walker (11)
| Henry Walker (11)
| Smart Araneta Coliseum
| 6–3
|-bgcolor=ccffcc
| 10
| October 27
| Columbian
| W 120–99
| Henry Walker (26)
| Henry Walker (11)
| John Pinto (5)
| Alonte Sports Arena
| 7–3

|-bgcolor=ffcccc
| 11
| November 4
| Phoenix
| L 91–97
| Henry Walker (21)
| John Paul Erram (14)
| John Pinto (10)
| Smart Araneta Coliseum
| 7–4

Playoffs

Bracket

Game log

|-bgcolor=ffcccc
| 1
| November 6
| Magnolia
| L 99–103
| Henry Walker (18)
| John Paul Erram (19)
| Pinto, Walker (5)
| Smart Araneta Coliseum
| 0–1

Transactions

Free agents

Trades

Recruited imports

Awards

References

Blackwater Bossing seasons
Blackwater Elite, 2017-18